Gratitude is a double live album by American band Earth, Wind & Fire, issued in November 1975 by Columbia Records. The album  spent six weeks atop the Billboard Top Soul Albums chart and three weeks atop the Billboard 200 chart. Gratitude has also been certified Triple Platinum in the US by the RIAA.

Overview
Gratitude was also co-produced by Maurice White and Charles Stepney. The LP consists of mostly live concert material together with some newly recorded tracks.

Singles
With the LP came "Sing a Song" which rose to No. 1 on the Billboard Hot Soul Songs chart and No. 5 on the Hot 100 chart. 
 Another single, "Can't Hide Love", got to No. 11 on the Billboard Hot Soul Songs chart. 
"Can't Hide Love" was also nominated for a Grammy in the category of Best Arrangement For Voices.

Critical reception

With a four out of five star rating Kit Aiken of Uncut called Gratitude "a kicking live album". Henry Edwards of the New York Times said "All of the music is carefully tooled, zestfully polished, relentlessly good‐natured rhythmic dance music, an amalgam of rhythm‐and‐blues, jazz and middle‐of‐the‐road pop that the group gleefully shouts, croons, squeals and growls. There's showmanship galore here, but strip that showmanship away and one discovers that Earth, Wind & Fire's music is built around one persistently repeated chord‐and not the world's most interesting chord either." Alex Henderson of Allmusic found that "Gratitude is one of EWF's finest accomplishments." Mike Kalina of the Pittsburgh Post Gazette claimed Gratitude "features a variety of superb rhythm and blues material with plenty of jazz overtones. The group's lyrics may not be the most innovative but they all fit perfectly into the patchwork of funk the group weaves. The musicianship of the group cannot be beat nor can the feeling that this group - my favorite in the R&B idiom - puts out." Tony Green of Spin exclaimed "A frightfully accomplished funk hit machine flexing its muscles live is truly a beautiful thing. And few had as much flex-worthy musical mass as these crossover kings. The White brothers melded proto-Afrocentricism with self help optimism, filling out their sound with Jazz leanings and swelling summer breeze ballads. An album that's capable at any moment of landing an emotional killer blow." Greg Kot of the Chicago Tribune found "an Ellingtonian fusion of styles on this live masterpiece."

EWF went on to win a Rock Music Award in the category of Best Soul Album for Gratitude. The album's title track was also Grammy nominated in the category of Best R&B Performance by a Duo or Group with Vocals.

Track listing

Original release

Note
 * indicates studio recording

1999 Legacy reissue (CK 65737)

Note
”Live Bonus Medley” Recorded Live on February 11, 1978, at Hollywood Sunset Sound Recorders in Hollywood, California for a 1978 TV Variety Special starring Natalie Cole.

Personnel
 Philip Bailey - vocals, congas, percussion
 Larry Dunn - organ, piano, Moog synthesizer
 Johnny Graham - guitar
 Michael Harris - trumpet
 Ralph Johnson - drums, percussion 
 Perry Jones - talking voice (1)
 Al McKay - guitar, percussion
 Don Myrick - saxophone
 Louis Satterfield - trombone
 Fred White - drums, percussion
 Maurice White - vocals, drums, timbales, kalimba
 Verdine White - vocals, bass, percussion
 Andrew Woolfolk - percussion, saxophone

Production
 Earth, Wind & Fire - arrangers (all tracks)
 Maurice White - audio mixing, remix producer (17), original recording producer (All tracks), original album producer
 Joe Wissert - producer (original recording - live tracks), original album producer
 Charles Stepney - arranger (studio tracks), producer (original recording - studio tracks),  original album producer
 Leo Sacks - producer (reissue), audio mixing (17)
 Joy Gilbert - project director
 Richard Salvato - director, direction
 Art Macnow - direction
 Howard Fritzson - art direction
 Steve Hall - mastering
 Mark Wilder - mastering
 Paul Klingberg - remix producer, audio mixing (17)
 George Massenburg - recording engineer (all tracks), mixing
 Cameron Marcarelli - assistant engineer, mixing assistant (17)
 Shusei Nagaoka - artwork
 Steve Newman - design
 David Redfern - photography, inlay photography
 Michael Cimicata - packaging manager

Charts and certifications

Weekly charts

Year-end charts

Singles

Certifications

Accolades
The information regarding accolades attributed to Gratitude is adapted from AcclaimedMusic.net, www.rockhall.com and rocklistmusic.co.uk.

See also
 List of number-one albums of 1976 (U.S.)
 List of number-one R&B albums of 1976 (U.S.)

References

1975 live albums
Earth, Wind & Fire live albums
Albums produced by Maurice White
Albums produced by Joe Wissert
Albums produced by Charles Stepney
Albums with cover art by Shusei Nagaoka
Columbia Records live albums
Legacy Recordings live albums